Iva Budařová and Helena Suková were the defending champions, but Suková did not compete this year. Budařová teamed up with Marcela Skuherská and lost in the first round to Andrea Holíková and Lea Plchová.

Sandra Cecchini and Raffaella Reggi won the title by defeating Patrizia Murgo and Barbara Romanò 1–6, 6–4, 6–3 in the final.

Seeds

Draw

Draw

External links
 ITF tournament profile

Italian Open - Women's Doubles
1985 Italian Open (tennis)